The 2014 Hawke's Bay Cup was the 1st edition of the invitational Hawke's Bay Cup competition. It took place between 5–13 April 2014 in Hastings,  New Zealand. A total of six teams competed for the title.

Argentina won the tournament for the first time after defeating Australia 3–0 in the final. China won the third place match by defeating New Zealand 3–2.

Teams
Including New Zealand, 6 teams were invited by the New Zealand Hockey Federation to participate in the tournament.

Results

Preliminary round

Pool

Fixtures

Classification round

Fifth and sixth place

Third and fourth place

Final

Statistics

Final standings

Goalscorers

References

External links

2014
2014 in women's field hockey
2014 in New Zealand women's sport
2014 in Argentine women's sport
2014 in Australian women's field hockey
2014 in Chinese women's sport
2014 in South Korean women's sport
2014 in Japanese women's sport